Nagpur South West Assembly constituency is one of the seats in Maharashtra Legislative Assembly in India. It is one of the six vidhan sabha segments of Nagpur Lok Sabha seat. The constituency is represented by former chief minister of Maharashtra and incumbent Deputy Chief Minister of Maharashtra Devendra Fadnavis.

Members of Legislative Assembly

Election results

See also
 List of constituencies of Maharashtra Vidhan Sabha

External links
District wise List of Assembly Constituencies, Chief Electoral Officer, Maharashtra

References 

Assembly constituencies of Nagpur district
Politics of Nagpur
Assembly constituencies of Maharashtra